The electoral district of Stanley was a Legislative Assembly electorate in the state of Queensland.

History

Stanley was created by the Electoral Districts Act of 1872 as a single-member seat (taking effect from 1873). From 1878 it became a two-member constituency through incorporation of part of the Electoral district of West Moreton
from which it had been derived in 1872. Stanley was abolished in the 1949 redistribution which placed most of it in the new Electoral district of Somerset.

Members
The following people represented Stanley:

 = by-election

See also
 Electoral districts of Queensland
 Members of the Queensland Legislative Assembly by year
 :Category:Members of the Queensland Legislative Assembly by name

References

Former electoral districts of Queensland
1873 establishments in Australia
1950 disestablishments in Australia
Constituencies established in 1873
Constituencies disestablished in 1950